The SIM Registration Act, officially designated as Republic Act No. 11934 and commonly referred to as the SIM card law, is a Philippine law mandating the registration of SIM cards before activation. Under the measure, mobile device users, including prepaid and postpaid, must register their SIM cards. The law was enacted intending to curb cybercriminal activities.

Legislative history 
A similar bill was initially passed in the 18th Congress but was vetoed by then-President Rodrigo Duterte on April 14, 2022 due to the inclusion of social media accounts, which Duterte "was constrained to disagree" with as it may "give rise to a situation of dangerous state intrusion and surveillance threatening many constitutionally protected rights".

House Bill No. 14 
The bill was filed before the House of Representatives as House Bill No. 14. It passed on third and final reading on September 19, 2022, with 250 members voting for the measure while 6 voted against it.

Senate Bill No. 1310 
Senator Grace Poe sponsored the measure's Senate counterpart, Senate Bill No. 1310. It passed on third and final reading on September 27, 2022, with all Senators present voting for the bill.

Republic Act No. 11934 
President Bongbong Marcos signed the law on October 10, 2022.

Implementation 
The Implementing Rules and Regulations (IRR) of the law was enacted on December 27, 2022. Postpaid subscribers are considered to already be registered with telco companies, only having to confirm the existing details already saved with the telco companies. On the other hand, prepaid subscribers are required to undergo registration through an online portal. During the first day of registration, users struggled to register their SIMs as telco companies faced glitches on their registration platforms. As of January 18, 2023, over 22 million SIMs were registered.

References 

Philippine legislation
2023 in the Philippines
Presidency of Bongbong Marcos
Telecommunications in the Philippines